Bernard Tomic won in the final of the first edition of these championships. He defeated his countryman Marinko Matosevic in three sets (5–7, 6–4, 6–3).

Seeds

Draw

Final four

Top half

Bottom half

External links
 Main Draw
 Qualifying Draw

Maccabi Men's Challenger - Singles